The Day of Reckoning is a 1915 American short drama film produced by the American Film Manufacturing Company, released by Mutual Film and directed by B. Reeves Eason. It stars Vivian Rich and David Lythgoe.

Cast
 Vivian Rich as Martha True
 David Lythgoe as John Walton
 Louise Lester as Mrs. Crew
 Jack Richardson as Carl Burton
 Charlotte Burton as Rita Marr

External links

1915 films
1915 drama films
1915 short films
Silent American drama films
American silent short films
American black-and-white films
American Film Company films
Films directed by B. Reeves Eason
1910s American films